Ricardo Medina Fierro (born 5 August 1975) is a Mexican politician affiliated with the PRI. He currently serves as Deputy of the LXII Legislature of the Mexican Congress representing Baja California since 7 March 2013.

References

1975 births
Living people
People from Mexicali
Institutional Revolutionary Party politicians
21st-century Mexican politicians
Deputies of the LXII Legislature of Mexico
Members of the Chamber of Deputies (Mexico) for Baja California
Politicians from Baja California